The Los Angeles Guitar Quartet (LAGQ) is an American classical guitar ensemble that was formed in 1980. It consists of John Dearman, William Kanengiser, Scott Tennant and Matthew Greif (who replaced original member Andrew York at the end of 2006). They play nylon string guitars to imitate a variety of instruments and effects.

They have played in many styles: baroque, bluegrass, flamenco, rock, and new-age. The quartet received a Grammy Award for Best Classical Crossover Album in 2005 for Guitar Heroes.

Background
Anisa Angarola assembled the quartet in 1980 at the University of Southern California with help from guitarist Pepe Romero. In 1990 Andrew York replaced Angarola. In 2006 York was replaced by Matthew Greif. The group's first album included works by Holst, Rossini, and Stravinsky. Although primarily a classical ensemble, the group dabbles in other genres. The album Guitar Heroes included music by Chet Atkins, Sergio Assad, Steve Howe, and Pat Metheny. The group has played classical music from the Baroque, Classical, Renaissance, Romantic, and modern periods.

Scott Tennant has recorded albums of the guitar works of Joaquín Rodrigo and the Celtic music of England, Ireland and Scotland. He has taught at the University of Southern California and has written method books for classical guitar. John Dearman plays a custom guitar with an added bass string and extended fretboard. He has taught at El Camino College and the University of California, Santa Barbara.

William Kanengiser has arranged works for the quartet, including the Hungarian Rhapsody No. 2 by Franz Liszt and the gamelan piece "Gongan". He has taught at the University of Southern California and is a graduate of the USC Thornton School of Music.

Awards and honors
 Latin, Grammy Award nomination, 2003
 Guitar Heroes, Grammy Award, Best Classical Crossover, 2005

Discography
 L.A. Guitar Quartet Recital (GHA, 1991)
 Dances from Renaissance to Nutcracker (Delos, 1992)
 Evening in Granada (Delos, 1993)
 Manuel de Falla: El Amor Brujo (GHA, 1994)
 Labyrinth (Delos, 1995)
 For Thy Pleasure (Delos, 1996)
 L.A.G.Q. (Sony, 1998)
 Air and Ground (Sony, 2000)
 LAGQ Latin (Telarc, 2002)
 Guitar Heroes (Telarc, 2004)
 Spin (Telarc, 2006)
 Brazil (Telarc, 2007)
 Interchange: Concertos by Rodrigo and Assad (Telarc, 2010)
 Boccherini: Guitar Quintets (Red Bus, 2011)
 New Renaissance (Burnside/Lagq, 2015)
 Opalescent (2022)

Articles
 Interview (1987), by Paul Magnussen

References

External links
 Official site
 Scott Tennant's website
 William Kanengiser's website
 Matthew Greif's website
 Andrew York's website

Musical groups established in 1980
Classical guitar ensembles
Grammy Award winners